The Houston Astros Radio Network is an American broadcast network of radio affiliates in operation since 1962 that broadcast coverage of the Houston Astros before, during, and after that team's games.  Radio content is broadcast in both the English and Spanish languages.  It consists of 26 stations (and 4 broadcast relay stations) that span across three states with its English flagship station as KBME and its Spanish flagship station as K231CE (an FM translator fed by an HD Radio signal of KODA), both in Houston. In addition to its affiliates, Houston Astros Radio Network content can be listened to on satellite radio via Sirius XM Radio and online using both MLB.tv and Sirius XM Internet Radio.

Sports commentators for the network are Robert Ford and Steve Sparks in English and Francisco Romero and Alex Treviño in Spanish. Astros games returned to KTRH in 2019, while also continuing to air on 790, KBME.

Affiliate stations

Current affiliate stations

Former affiliate stations

See also
List of Houston Astros broadcasters
Root Sports Southwest
Texas State Network

References

External links
Official list of affiliates

Houston Astros
Major League Baseball on the radio
Sports radio networks in the United States
1962 establishments in Texas